Mundo Feliz was the second album released by Mexican rock band Fobia in 1991.

Track listing
 Brincas (Jump)
 El Pepinillo Marino (The sea cucumber)
 Camila (Camila)
 El cerebro (The brain)
 Caminitos hacia el Cosmos (Little roads towards the Cosmos)
 El diablo (The devil)
 La fecha especial (The special date)
 Sacúdeme (Shake me)
 Mi pequeño corazón (My little heart)
 Mundo feliz (Happy world)
 Apachurrar el corazón (Smashing the heart)

Personnel
 Leonardo de Lozanne: vocals
 Cha!: bass
 Francisco Huidobro: guitar
 Gabriel: drums
 Iñaki: keyboards

References

1991 albums
Fobia albums